Carabus adamsi is a species of ground beetle in the large genus Carabus that is native to parts of Russia, Georgia and Azerbaijan.

References

adamsi
Insects described in 1817
Insects of Russia
Insects of Azerbaijan